Anebetsu Station is a railway station of JR Hokkaido Nemuro Main Line located in Hamanaka, Akkeshi District, Kushiro Subprefecture, Hokkaidō, Japan which opened at Nov. 25, 1919.

External links

Railway stations in Hokkaido Prefecture
Stations of Hokkaido Railway Company
Railway stations in Japan opened in 1919
Hamanaka, Hokkaido